Gouramangi Singh Moirangthem (born 25 January 1986) is an Indian former professional footballer. He is currently the assistant coach of Indian Super League club Goa.

Club career
A product of the Tata Football Academy, he has plied his trade with many clubs in the country, including Dempo SC and Churchill Brothers. While at Dempo, Singh won the Federation Cup and the National Football League. Gouramangi is one of the tallest players in the India national team and possesses an ability to head the ball strongly especially in set piece situations and is also effective in tackling.

Over the course of his professional career, Singh has won nearly every club trophy in India, including the National Football League (which was replaced by the I-League) and the Federation Cup with Mahindra United in 2005/2006 & the I-League in 2009. Singh was also voted the best defender in the I-League for the 2008/09 season.

In 2010, Gouramangi was called upon by Melbourne Heart for a trial, which despite reportedly impressing Heart staff, was unsuccessful. It was mutually decided that Gouramangi would not get first opportunities in presence of other stars.

Churchill Brothers
Gouramangi joined Churchill Brothers from Sporting Clube De Goa in the year 2007-08 I league season and remained with the club until 2013. He won 1 league, two IFA Shields and Two Durand Cups during his five years with Churchill brothers.

Rangdajied United
On 20 November 2013, despite earlier rejecting ISL signed players, Rangdajied United F.C. of the I-League agreed to sign Gouramangi on as well as Subrata Pal, Sandesh Jhingan, Manandeep Singh, and Tomba Singh.

He made his debut in the I-League on 22 November 2013 against Shillong Lajong F.C. at the Jawaharlal Nehru Stadium, Shillong in which he played the whole match as Rangdajied drew the match 1–1.

Chennai
In the fall of 2014 Gouramangi singh joined Chennaiyin FC in the inaugural season of Indian Super League, joining the likes of Marco Materazzi.

Bharat FC
Gouramangi Singh signed with newly formed Bharat FC for the 2014–15 I-League He was the captain of the team.

FC Pune City
On 21 March 2015 FC Pune City announced that they had signed Gouramangi Singh for the 2015 Indian Super League season.

NEROCA
In 2017, he signed with NEROCA.

International career
Gouramangi first rose to prominence when he captained the winning Indian team (Under 18) at the Ian Rush Trophy in 2003. He came through the youth set up of All India Football Federation (AIFF), Gouramangi was part of the U-17 Indian squad participating in the 2002 AFC U-17 Championship, Abu Dhabi. He was also part of the U-20 Indian squad participating in the 2005 FIFA World Youth Championship, Netherlands. He played in the Olympic qualifiers for the Indian U-23 team, where his defending allowed India to earn an unlikely 1–1 draw with the Iraq U-23 team. On 18 April 2006, Gouramangi was surprisingly added to India's preliminary squad for the 2006 FIFA World Cup in Germany, the only uncapped player to be chosen by senior team manager Syed Nayeemuddin. On 15 May 2006, he was eventually added to their final 23-man squad, being given the number 10 shirt. He made his debut on 20 June 2006 in the final group stage game against New Zealand, scoring through a penalty in an eventual 1–2 loss. He played a vital part of the Indian team that won the 2007 Nehru Cup. Gouramangi also played an important part of the victorious India team at the 2008 AFC Challenge Cup. After joining the national team in 2006, he has been a vital player in coach Houghton's side. On 28 July 2011 Singh scored a significant goal for India in the 2014 FIFA World Cup qualifier against the United Arab Emirates but it did not help as India were knocked out 5–2 on aggregate. Singh nodded home from a Clifford Miranda free kick with rival goalkeeper Ngome Lawrence out of his line. He scored his 7th goal for India in Final of 2012 Nehru Cup against Cameroon.

International goals

International statistics

Coaching career

Bengaluru United
On 26 December 2019, it was announced that Gouramangi joined Bengaluru United as head coach. He managed the club in Bangalore Super Division League. He later became assistant coach of the club.

FC Goa
On 13 July 2022 he was appointed as a First-team assistant coach of Indian Super league club FC Goa.

Honours

India
 AFC Challenge Cup: 2008
 SAFF Cup: 2011; runner-up: 2008, 2013
 Nehru Cup: 2007, 2009, 2012

India U20
 South Asian Games Silver medal: 2004

Club
 National League Champions 2004-05 (Dempo SC) ; 2005–06 (Mahindra United)
 I-League 2008-09 Champions
 Federation Cup Champions 2004-05 (Dempo SC) ; 2005–06 (Mahindra United)

Individual
 AIFF Player of the Year: 2010
 I-League Best Defender of the 2008–09 season.

Personal life
Gouramangi Singh hails from the small village of Awang Sekmai, a 17 kilometers north of Imphal and comes from a modest background.

Salary
Gouramangi is notable for being one of India's highest paid footballers and even sportspeople. While at Churchill Brothers Singh made Rs.1 crore playing in the 2012–13 season. Playing for Prayag United Singh earned an impressive Rs. 1.05 crore from his club. During the 2014 Indian Super League Gouramangi, along with Subrata Pal and Syed Rahim Nabi where the most valuable players of the league making Rs. 80 lakhs each.

References

External links
 
 Gauramangi Singh at RSSSF
 Gouramangi Singh at Goal.com
 
 

1986 births
Living people
Indian footballers
India international footballers
India youth international footballers
Churchill Brothers FC Goa players
Meitei people
2011 AFC Asian Cup players
I-League players
Mahindra United FC players
Rangdajied United F.C. players
Bharat FC players
DSK Shivajians FC players
People from Imphal West district
Footballers from Manipur
Indian Super League players
Chennaiyin FC players
FC Pune City players
NEROCA FC players
Association football central defenders
Footballers at the 2006 Asian Games
Asian Games competitors for India
South Asian Games silver medalists for India
South Asian Games medalists in football